Even As You and I is a 1917 American silent drama film directed by Lois Weber and starring Ben F. Wilson, Mignon Anderson and Bertram Grassby.

Cast
 Ben F. Wilson as Carrillo
 Mignon Anderson as Selma
 Bertram Grassby as Artist
 Priscilla Dean as Artist's Wife
 Harry Carter as Saturniska
 Maude George as Cleo 
 Hayward Mack as Jacques
 Earle Page as Stray
 Edwin Wallock as Wisdom
 Seymour Hastings as Experience

References

Bibliography
 John T. Soister, Henry Nicolella & Steve Joyce. American Silent Horror, Science Fiction and Fantasy Feature Films, 1913-1929. McFarland, 2014.

External links
 

1917 films
1917 drama films
1910s English-language films
American silent feature films
Silent American drama films
American black-and-white films
Universal Pictures films
Films directed by Lois Weber
1910s American films